Julia Glushko and Alexandra Panova were the defending champions, but both players chose not to participate.

Emina Bektas and Sanaz Marand won the title, defeating Kristie Ahn and Lizette Cabrera in the final, 6–3, 1–6, [10–2].

Seeds

Draw

References
Main Draw

Hardee's Pro Classic - Doubles
Hardee's Pro Classic